This is a list of current and previous Royal Australian Air Force airstrips, aerodromes and bases.  The air force also owns and maintains "bare bases" in remote areas of Australia. These bases have runways and buildings, but only a caretaker staff. They are generally only used for exercises as there are no units permanently based there.

Current bases

Australian Capital Territory
Defence Establishment Fairbairn, Canberra

New South Wales
RAAF Base Glenbrook, Glenbrook (near Sydney)
Defence Establishment Orchard Hills, Orchard Hills (near Sydney)
RAAF Base Richmond, Richmond (near Sydney)
RAAF Base Wagga, Wagga Wagga
RAAF Base Williamtown, Williamtown (near Newcastle)

Northern Territory
RAAF Base Darwin, Darwin
RAAF Base Tindal, Katherine

Queensland
RAAF Base Amberley, Ipswich (near Brisbane)
RAAF Scherger near Weipa (bare base)
RAAF Base Townsville, Townsville

South Australia
RAAF Base Edinburgh, Edinburgh (near Adelaide)
RAAF Woomera Range Complex, a large military and civil aerospace facility in the Far North region
RAAF Base Woomera, an air base contained within the complex, near Woomera Village

Victoria
RAAF Base East Sale, Sale
RAAF Williams, Laverton Base, Laverton (near Melbourne)
RAAF Williams, Point Cook Base, Point Cook (near Melbourne)

Western Australia
RAAF Curtin near Derby (bare base)
RAAF Gingin, Gingin (airfield only)
RAAF Learmonth near Exmouth (bare base)
RAAF Base Pearce, Bullsbrook (near Perth)

Former Headquarters

RAAF Area Combined Headquarters, North-Eastern area, Townsville, Queensland. Relocated from Port Moresby, Papua New Guinea
RAAF Area Combined Headquarters, North-Western area, Darwin, Northern Territory
RAAF Area Combined Headquarters, South-Eastern area, Melbourne, Victoria
RAAF Area Combined Headquarters, South-Western area, Fremantle, Western Australia

Former bases in Australia

Australian Capital Territory
RAAF Base Fairbairn, Canberra – now Fairbairn Business Park and part of Canberra Airport. Decommissioned as an RAAF base in 2003 although No. 34 Squadron (VIP transport) is still based there.

New South Wales
RAAF Base Albion Park, Albion Park
RAAF Base Coffs Harbour, Coffs Harbour
RAAF Base Evans Head, Evans Head
RAAF Jervis Bay, Jervis Bay
RAAF Base Moruya, Moruya
RAAF Base Nabiac, Nabiac
RAAF Base Rathmines, Rathmines – The largest flying boat base in Australia
RAAF Base Temora, Temora
RAAF Base Uranquinty, Uranquinty – 1941–45 Pilot training, and 1947–52 No.1 Basic Flying Training School for RAAF & RAN

Northern Territory
RAAF Base Daly Waters, Daly Waters

Queensland
RAAF Base Bowen, Bowen
RAAF Base Cairns, Cairns

South Australia
RAAF Base Mallala, Mallala

Victoria
RAAF Base Mildura, Mildura
RAAF Base West Sale, Sale
RAAF Tottenham (Stores Depot), Maribyrnong
RAAF Ballarat, Ballarat

Stations in Australia
RAAF Stations were principally civil airfields with a permanent RAAF Station Headquarters and used for operational flying.
RAAF Station Archerfield, Archerfield Airport, Brisbane, Queensland
RAAF Station Bairnsdale, Bairnsdale, Victoria
RAAF Station Bowen, Bowen, Queensland. Disbanded and reformed as RAAF Base Bowen.
RAAF Station Bulga, Bulga, New South Wales
RAAF Station Bundaberg, Bundaberg, Queensland
RAAF Station Camden, Camden, New South Wales
RAAF Station Cunderdin, Cunderdin, Western Australia
RAAF Station Deniliquin, Deniliquin, New South Wales
RAAF Station Evans Head, Evans Head, New South Wales
RAAF Station Guildford, Guildford, Western Australia
RAAF Station Mascot, Mascot, New South Wales
RAAF Station Narrandera, Narrandera, New South Wales
RAAF Station Narromine, Narromine, New South Wales
RAAF Station Nowra, Nowra, New South Wales
RAAF Station Pokolbin, Cessnock, New South Wales
RAAF Station Sandgate, Brisbane, Queensland
RAAF Station Schofields, Schofields, New South Wales
RAAF Station Tocumwal, Tocumwal, New South Wales
RAAF Station Wagga, Wagga Wagga, New South Wales
RAAF Station West Sale, West Sale, Victoria

Airfields in Australia
Civil or temporary airfields used by the RAAF and allied air forces during World War II for operational flying but which did not have a permanent RAAF Station Headquarters.

New South Wales

Sydney Basin

Bankstown Aerodrome, Bankstown
Bargo
Bringelly Emergency Landing Ground, Bringelly
Calwalla
Camden see RAAF Station Camden
Castlereagh Aerodrome, 
Fleurs Aerodrome, Kemps Creek
Hoxton Park Landing Ground, Hoxton Park – Emergency and training field
Marsden Park Aerodrome, Marsden Park
Mascot see RAAF Station Mascot
Menangle Aerodrome, Menangle Park – Satellite of Schofields
Mittagong Aerodrome
Moss Vale
Mount Druitt Aerodrome, Mount Druitt
Nepean Dam
Pitt Town
Ravenswood – Satellite of Fleur (not proceeded with)
Richmond Aerodrome see RAAF Base Richmond
Schofields Aerodrome see RAAF Station Schofields
The Oaks Aerodrome,  – Satellite of Camden 
Wallgrove Aerodrome (Doonside), Doonside

Hunter & Central Coast

Broke Aerodrome, satellite of RAAF Station Bulga
Bulga Aerodrome, see RAAF Station Bulga
Cessnock Aerodrome
Dungog Aerodrome, satellite of RAAF Base Williamtown
Glendon Aerodrome
Hexham Aerodrome
Hotham Aerodrome
Newcastle Aerodrome (Broadmeadow, District Park), 
Pokolbin Aerodrome see RAAF Station Pokolbin
Rathmines see RAAF Base Rathmines
Rothbury Aerodrome, satellite of RAAF Station Pokolbin (not proceeded with) 
Ringwood Aerodrome, 
Nandowra Aerodrome, 
Strowan Aerodrome, Jerrys Plains, satellite of RAAF Station Bulga
Tuggerah Aerodrome, Tuggerah, satellite of Fleurs Aerodrome
Williamtown see RAAF Base Williamtown
Warkworth Aerodrome, satellite of RAAF Station Bulga
Weston Aerodrome, satellite of RAAF Station Pokolbin (not proceeded with) 
Woy Woy Aerodrome, Woy Woy, satellite of RAAF Station Schofields and

North Coast & New England

Coffs Harbour Aerodrome, Coffs Harbour
Clairville Aerodrome, 
Evans Head Aerodrome, see RAAF Station Evans Head
Glen Innes Aerodrome, 
Guyra Aerodrome, Guyra
Nabiac Aerodrome, see RAAF Base Nabiac
Wellingrove Aerodrome,

Darling Plains

Burroway
Buckwoodlands
Calala
Dandaloo
Dubbo
Gidley
Iowa
Jones
Minore
Mogriguy
Narromine, see RAAF Station Narromine
Piggot
Tamworth
Timbrebongie
Trangie
Trescowthick
Woodlands

Central West

Blowclear
Brolgan
Copper Ridge
Fish River Aerodrome, Fish River
Goobang East
Goulburn Landing Ground, Goulburn
Lake Cargelligo
Millthorpe
Orange
Parkes, see RAAF Station Parkes
Raglan
Spring Creek Reservoir
Tichbourne

Murrumbidgee

Belfrayden
Bundidjarie
Combaning
Cootamundra
Cudjello
Forest Hill
Gobbabaula
Grong Grong Road
Junee Road
Kendalls
Lake Albert
Lake Coolah
Narrandera, see RAAF Station Narrandera
Pucawan
Temora
Tootool
Uranquinty, see RAAF Base Uranquinty
Wagga Road
Wagga Wagga RAAF
Yarragundry
Young Road

Murray

Allandale
Albury
Bradley Field
Corowa
Deniliquin, see RAAF Station Deniliquin
Denison
Dry Forest
Hopefield
Leetham Field
Morocco
Stud Park
Tocumwal
Wait O While
Wandook
Wangonilla
Warbreccan

South Coast

Albion Park Aerodrome, see RAAF Base Albion Park
Cordeaux Aerodrome, Cordeux Dam
Jervis Bay, see RAAF Base Jervis Bay
Moruya Airfield (World War II installations), Moruya Airport
Nowra, see RAAF Station Nowra
Vineyards Aerodrome

Western Plains

Broken Hill
Cobar
Lake Victoria
North Bourke
Roto
Wentworth

Norfolk Island
Norfolk Island Airfield, Norfolk Island

Northern Territory

Adelaide River Emergency Landing Ground, near Adelaide River
Alice Springs Airfield (7 Mile), Alice Springs
Austin Strip (RAAF Melville Island), Milikapiti, Melville Island
Batchelor Airfield, Batchelor
Bathurst Island Airfield, Bathurst Island
Berry Springs
Birdum Airfield, Birdum
Blyth No. 1 E.L.G
Brunette Downs
Coomalie Creek Airfield, Coomalie Creek
Cape Fourcroy
Carson's Field, 
Daly Waters Airfield, see RAAF Daly Waters
Fenton Airfield, 
Gorrie Airfield, 
Gould Airfield, 
Gove Airfield (Melville Bay Airfield), Gove Peninsula
Groote Eylandt Airfield, Groote Eylandt
Hughes Airfield (32 Mile), 
Katherine Airfield, 
Koolpinyah H.S. E.L.G
Livingstone Airfield (34 Mile), 
Long Airfield, 
Manbulloo Airfield, Manbulloo Station, 
MacDonald Airfield, north of  
Maranboy E.L.G
Milingimbi Airfield, Milingimbi Island
O'Connor's Field, Howard Island
Oenpelli Emergency Landing Ground, Alligator River
Parap Airfield (Darwin Aerodrome/Ross Smith Aerodrome), 
Pine Creek Airfield, 
Port Keats Airfield, Port Keats
Reynolds No. 4 Emergency Landing Ground, Reynolds
Strauss Airfield (27 Mile Field, Humpty Doo Strip), 
Tennant Creek Airfield, Tennant Creek
Tipperary No. 9 Emergency Landing Ground
Venn
Willing
Woolyanna No. 8B Emergency Landing Ground

Queensland

Aitkenvale Aerodrome (Weir), Aitkenvale, Townsville
Antil Plains Aerodrome, Antill Plains
Amberley, see RAAF Base Amberley
Archerfield, see RAAF Station Archerfield
Augustus Downs
Balfe's Creek
Barcaldine
Beenleigh
Blackall
Bohle River Aerodrome, Townsville
Bowen, see RAAF Base Bowen
Breddan Aerodrome, Breddan, Charters Towers
Brunette Downs
Brymaroo
Bundaberg, see RAAF Station Bundaberg
Cairns, see RAAF Base Cairns
Camooweal
Canobie Station
Carpentaria Downs
Cecil Plains
Charleville Aerodrome, Charleville
Charters Towers
Cloncurry Aerodrome, Cloncurry
Coen
Condamine
Cooktown Aerodrome (Cooktown Mission), Cooktown
Coominya
Cunnamulla
Dunk Island
Eagle Farm Airfield, Brisbane
Elliot
Fanning
Gailes
Garbutt, see RAAF Base Garbutt
Giru
Goolman
Higgins Field (Red Island Point, Red Point, Jacky Jacky or Bamaga)
Horn Island Aerodrome, Horn Island
Inverleigh
Jondaryan
Kingaroy
Kingston (Woodridge)
Iron Range Aerodrome (Claudie & Gordon), Kutini-Payamu National Park
Laura
Leyburn Airfield, Leyburn
Loganlea
Longreach
Lowood
Mackay
Macrossan
Mareeba
Maryborough
Milgarra station
Mount Hedlow
Mitchell River Mission
Mornington Island Airfield, Mornington Island
Mount Isa
Mount St John
Mount Surprise
Normanton
Oakey
Palm Island
Petrie
Powlathunga
Reid River
Rockhampton
Ross River
Runcorn (ELG)
Southport Waterfield
Strathglass
Strathpine
Stock Route
Toogoolawah
Toowoomba
Torrens Creek
Upper Ross River (Kelso Field)
Waterford
Winton
Wivenhoe
Wondoola Station
Woodstock
Wrotham Park

South Australia

Ceduna Airfield, Ceduna
Gawler Aerodrome, Gawler
Kingscote Airfield, Kangaroo Island
Mount Gambier Airfield, Mount Gambier
Oodnadatta Airfield, Oodnadatta
Parafield Airfield, Adelaide
Port Lincoln Airfield, Port Lincoln
Port Pirie Airfield, Port Pirie

Tasmania

Auburn Landing Ground (not proceeded with)
Cambridge Aerodrome, Hobart
Currie Aerodrome, Currie, King Island
Nile Relief Landing Ground, Nile
Pats River Aerodrome, Flinders Island
Quorn Hall Aerodrome, Campbell Town
Tunbridge Aerodrome, Tunbridge
Valleyfield Aerodrome, Valleyfield (near Epping Forest)
Western Junction Aerodrome, Launceston

Victoria

Ararat Aerodrome, Ararat
Bacchus Marsh Aerodrome, Bacchus Marsh
Bairnsdale, see RAAF Station Bairnsdale
Ballarat, see RAAF Station Ballarat
Benalla Aerodrome, Benalla
Craigieburn Aerodrome, Craigieburn
Cranbourne
Cressy Aerodrome, Cressy
Dutson
East Stratford, not proceeded with 
Essendon Aerodrome, Essendon
Exford, dispersal aerodrome for Laverton
Fishermen's Bend Aerodrome, Fishermans Bend
Flynn's Creek, not proceeded with
Gifford
Glengarry
Greenhills
Hamilton Airport
Heath Hill
Koo-wee-rup
Lakeside
Lara
Little River 
Mallacoota Aerodrome, Mallacoota
Mangalore West Aerodrome, Mangaloe
Maryvale
Mildura, see RAAF Base Mildura
Monomeith Aerodrome, Monomeith
Mordialloc, emergency landing aerodrome
Murchison East Aerodrome, Murchison
Nambrok
Nhill Aerodrome, Nhill
Oaklands
Point CookSwan Hill Aerodrome, Swan Hill
Truganina, dispersal aerodrome for Laverton
Warrnambool Aerodrome, Warrnambool
Werribee Satellite Aerodrome, Werribee
West Sale, see RAAF Base West SaleWilsons Promontory Aerodrome, Wilsons Promontory
Wooloomanata Aerodrome, Wooloomanata Station
Yelta, relief landing ground for Mildura

 Western Australia 

 Agnew
 Ajana
 Albany Airfield, Albany
 Anna Plains
 Argyle Downs
 Bald Hill
 Bamboo Spring
 Beverley
 Big Bell
 Bindoon
 Bonnie Downs
 Boologooro
 Boorabbin
 Broome Airfield, Broome
 Bunbury Aerodrome, Bunbury
 Busselton Airfield, Busselton
 Callawa Station
 Campbell
 Cape Leveque
 Carlton Station
 Carnarvon Airfield, Carnarvon
 Coolawanyah
 Corunna Downs Airfield, Corunna Downs
 Christmas Creek
 Cue
 Cunderdin
 Darlot
 De Grey
 Derby
 Dowerin South
 Durey
 Drysdale Mission Airfield see Kalumburu Edjudina
 Esperance Airfield, Esperance
 Exmouth Gulf
 Exmouth Gulf No. 2
 Fitzroy Crossing
 Flora Valley
 Forrest
 Forrest River Mission, see Oombulgurri Georgina
 Geraldton
 Gingin North see RAAF Gingin Goomalling
 Gordon Downs
 Guildford, Western Australia, see RAAF Station Guildford Halls Creek
 Hamelin Pool, see Hamelin Pool Station Hillman
 Hillside
 Ivanhoe, see Kununurra Kalgoorlie
 Karungie Station
 Katanning
 Kimberley Downs
 Kojarena
 Kununoppin
 Lagrange, see Lagrange Bay Laverton
 Learmonth, see RAAF Learmonth and 
 Leonora see Leonora Airport
 Lissadell
 Liveringa Station
 Lyndon
 Maylands Airfield, Maylands
 Marble Bar
 Mardie
 Margaret River, Kimberley
 Marrillana
 Meckering
 Meekatharra
 Meka Station
 Merredin ELG
 Middle Swan (Caversham), Caversham
 Mileura
 Minchins Soak
 Minderoo
 Minilya North
 Moola Bulla
 Mooliabeenee
 Moora
 Monkey Mia see Shark Bay Airport
 Mount House see Mount House Station
 Mount Magnet
 Mount Sir Samuel see Sir Samuel
 Muchea East
 Muccan Station
 Mulga Downs see Mulga Downs Station
 Mulyie
 Munja
 Nannine
 Narrogin West
 Narrogin East
 Nicholson Station
 Nilli Bubbaca
 Nookanbah (Noonkanbah) Airfield, Noonkanbah Station
 Norseman
 North West Cape
 Onslow
 Pearce
 Perth
 Pinjarra North
 Port Hedland
 Reedy
 Rockwell
 Roebourne
 Rottnest Island
 Roy Hill
 Sandstone
 Southern Cross
 Sturt River
 Tableland Station
 Tenindewa
 Three Springs
 Thundelburra
 Turkey Creek
 Turner River
Truscott Airfield, Anjo Peninsula
 Upper Swan
 Wagin
 Walkaway
 Warrawagine
 Weebo
 Whim Creek
 Wiluna
 Winning Pool
 Wittenoom
 Wollal
 Wooramel
 Wyndham
 Yalgoo
 Yampi Sound
 Yandal
 Yanrey
 Yinnietharra
 Yuin Station
 Yulleroo
 Zanthus

Flying boat stations in Australia 
Broome Flying Boat Base, Broome, Western Australia.
Colmslie Flying Boat Base, Brisbane, Queensland. Shared with US Naval Air Station, Brisbane.
Doctor's Gully Flying Boat Base, Darwin, Northern Territory.
Hamilton Flying Boat Base, Brisbane, Queensland.
Karumba Flying Boat Base, Karumba, Queensland.
Lake Boga Flying Boat Base, Lake Boga, Victoria. Flying boat repair facility.
Melville Bay Flying Boat Base, Melville Bay, Northern Territory.
RAAF Marine Section Adelaide, Adelaide, South Australia.
RAAF Marine Section Brisbane, Brisbane, Queensland.
RAAF Marine Section Bowen, Bowen, Queensland.
RAAF Marine Section Bundaberg, Bundaberg, Queensland.
RAAF Marine Section Cairns, Cairns, Queensland.
RAAF Marine Section Cockatoo Island, Cockatoo Island, Western Australia.
RAAF Marine Section East Arm, Darwin, Northern Territory.
RAAF Marine Section Evans Head, Evans Head, New South Wales.
RAAF Marine Section Fremantle, Fremantle, Western Australia.
RAAF Marine Section Geraldton, Geraldton, Western Australia.
RAAF Marine Section Groote Island, Groote Eylandt, Northern Territory.
RAAF Marine Section Jervis Bay, Jervis Bay.
RAAF Marine Section Lake Boga, Lake Boga, Victoria.
RAAF Marine Section Melbourne, Melbourne, Victoria.
RAAF Marine Section Millingimbi, Milingimbi, Northern Territory.
RAAF Marine Section Newcastle, Newcastle, New South Wales.
RAAF Marine Section Paynesville, Paynesville, Victoria.
RAAF Marine Section Perth, Perth, Western Australia.
RAAF Marine Section Point Cook, Point Cook, Victoria.
RAAF Marine Section Potshot, near Exmouth, Western Australia.
RAAF Marine Section Thursday Island, Thursday Island, Queensland.
RAAF Marine Section Townsville, Townsville, Queensland.
Redland Bay Flying Boat Base, Redland Bay, near Brisbane, Queensland.
 Rathmines Flying Boat Base, Lake Macquarie, New South Wales, South of Newcastle.
Rose Bay Flying Boat Base, Rose Bay, Sydney, New South Wales.
St George's Basin Flying Boat Base, near Jervis Bay.

Bases overseas 
Australian or allied bases at which RAAF units were permanently stationed.
RAAF Area Combined Headquarters, North-Eastern area, Port Moresby, Papua New Guinea. Later moved to Townsville, Queensland.
Butterworth Air Base, Butterworth, Penang, Malaysia (formerly RAAF Base Butterworth). Some RAAF units were based at Butterworth Air Base as part of the Five Power Defence Arrangements.
RAAF Base Cocos Island, Cocos (Keeling) Islands, Indian Ocean.
 RAAF Base Tengah was collocated with RAF Tengah in the 1950s at what is now Tengah Airbase, Singapore. No 1 Squadron Lincoln Bombers were based there for most of the 1950s, and other units were also there at times.
RAAF Base Port Moresby, Port Moresby, Papua New Guinea.
RAAF Ubon, Ubon Ratchathani, Thailand.
RAF Siu Sai Wan, Hong Kong.
Al Minhad Air Base in the UAE, shared with the UAE military and other allies.

Airfields overseas 
Civil, temporary or captured airfields used by the RAAF during World War II.
Dili Airfield, Dili, Timor.
Kila Kila Airfield, near Port Moresby, Papua New Guinea.
Milne Bay Airbase Complex, Milne Bay, Papua New Guinea.  Consisting of Turnbull Field, Gurney Field and Gurney Flying Boat Base.
Mokmer Airfield, Biak Island, Dutch New Guinea.
Sandakan Airfield, Sabah, British North Borneo.
Tarakan Airfield, Tarakan, Kalimantan Timur, Indonesia.
Wards Airfield, near Port Moresby, Papua New Guinea.

Flying boat stations overseas 
Australian and allied flying boat bases used by the RAAF during World War II.
Cape Chater Flying Boat Base, Cape Chater, Timor.
Gorontalo Flying Boat Base, Gorontalo, Sulawesi, Indonesia.
Gurney Flying Boat Base, Milne Bay, Papua New Guinea. Part of Milne Bay Airbase.
Lingayen Gulf Flying Boat Base, Lingayen Gulf, Luzon, Philippines.
Port Vila Flying Boat Base, Port Vila, New Hebrides.
Port Moresby Flying Boat Base, Port Moresby, Papua New Guinea.
Fakfak Flying Boat Base, Fakfak, Dutch New Guinea.
Yampi Sound Flying Boat Base, Yampi Sound, Indian Ocean.

See also

References
 Lake Boga at War, Brett Freeman; 
A Potted History of the RAAF

 
Air Force installations
Installations
Australia